Hamner is a surname. Notable people with the surname include:

Cully Hamner (born 1969), American comic book artist
Earl Hamner, Jr. (1923–2016), American television writer and producer
Garvin Hamner (1924–2003), American baseball player
Granny Hamner (1927–1993), American baseball player
Henry K. Hamner (1922–1945), United States Navy officer
M. Gail Hamner (born 1963), American scholar, author, and professor of religion
Millie Hamner, American educator and politician
Nora Spencer Hamner (1895–1971), American nurse
Ralph Hamner (1916–2001), American baseball player
Scott Hamner (born 1956), American television writer

See also
Nicholas Hamner Cobbs (1796–1861), Bishop of the Episcopal Church in the United States of America
USS Hamner (DD-718), a Gearing-class destroyer
Hanmer (disambiguation)